Mouhanad El-Sabagh (born April 23, 1988) is an Egyptian basketball player for Smouha of the Egyptian Basketball Super League. He played for the Egyptian national team, where he participated at the 2014 FIBA Basketball World Cup.

Awards and accomplishments

Club
Al Ahly
FIBA Africa Clubs Champions Cup: (2016)
Egyptian Super League: (2016)
Al Ittihad Alexandria
2× Egyptian Super League: (2009, 2010)
Egyptian Cup: (2010)

References

1988 births
Living people
Egyptian men's basketball players
Point guards
Al Ittihad Alexandria Club basketball players
Smouha SC basketball players
Shooting guards
2014 FIBA Basketball World Cup players
Al Ahly basketball players
Sportspeople from Alexandria